The Golden Urn refers to a method for selecting Tibetan reincarnations by drawing lots or tally sticks from a Golden Urn introduced by the Qing dynasty of China in 1793. After the Sino-Nepalese War, the Qianlong Emperor promulgated the 29-Article Ordinance for the More Effective Governing of Tibet, which included regulations on the selection of lamas. The Golden Urn was introduced ostensibly to prevent cheating and corruption in the selection process but also to position the Qianlong Emperor as a religious authority capable of adducing incarnation candidates. A number of lamas, such as the 8th and 9th Panchen Lamas and the 10th Dalai Lama, were confirmed using the Golden Urn. In cases where the Golden Urn was not used, the amban was consulted. Usage of the Golden Urn ended with the fall of the Qing dynasty in 1911.

History

Qing dynasty
The Golden Urn originated in a decree issued by the Qianlong Emperor in 1792, after the Qing victory in the Second Invasion of the Sino-Nepalese War. Article One of the decree, the 29-Article Ordinance for the More Effective Governing of Tibet, was designed to be used in the selection of rinpoches or lamas and other high offices within Tibetan Buddhism, including the Dalai Lamas, Panchen Lamas and Mongolian lamas. In Qianlong Emperor's article The Discourse of Lama which was published also in 1792, he explained the history of lamas and the reincarnation system, he inferred that the reincarnation system is only man-made, and creating rules is only to facilitate those monks, and to eliminate drawbacks associated with the man-made reincarnation. 

The 29-Article Ordinance for the More Effective Governing of Tibet allows the Qing Emperors of China to control the selection process, to prevent the Mongol and Tibetan nobles from taking advantage of the reincarnation process to seize religious power and to prevent the great lamas from  combing with secular forces.

Two Golden Urns were issued by the Qianlong Emperor: one is enshrined in Jokhang Temple in Lhasa and is to be used for choosing Dalai and Panchen Lama reincarnations; the other is in Yonghe Temple in Beijing for choosing Mongolian Lama, known as Jebtsundamba Khutughtu, reincarnations.

The specific ritual to be followed when using the Golden Urn was written by the 8th Dalai Lama, Jamphel Gyatso. The names and dates of birth of each candidate were to be written in the Manchu, Han, and Tibetan languages on metal or ivory slips and placed in the golden urn. After prayers before the statue of the Jowo in the Jokhang temple in Lhasa, a slip was drawn. The 7th Panchen Lama, Palden Tenpai Nyima, used the Golden Urn for the first time in 1822 to choose the 10th Dalai Lama, Tsultrim Gyatso.

Republic of China

On 12 August 1927, the Central Government mandated that before the publication of new laws, all laws in history regarding Tibetan Buddhism should continue unless there were conflicts with new doctrine or new laws of the Central Government. 

In August 1929, the Supreme Court of the Central Government stated that before the publication of new laws, laws in history regarding Tibet, regarding reincarnation of rinpoches or lamas were applicable 

In 1935, the Ordinance of Lama Temple Management was published by the Central Government of China. Article 2 states that reincarnated lamas are limited to those who were reincarnated previously in history, unless it was approved by the Central Government. Article 5 states that all monasteries/temples and lamas must be registered with Mongolian and Tibetan Affairs Commission. Article 7 states that the methods for reincarnation, appointment, rewards and punishments, registration, etc. of lamas shall be drafted by the Mongolian and Tibetan Affairs Commission and submitted to the Executive Yuan for approval.

In 1936, based on articles 2 and 7 of the Ordinance of Lama Temple Management, the Method of Reincarnation of Lamas was published by the Mongolian and Tibetan Affairs Commission of the Central Government.

Article 3 states that the death of lamas including the Dalai Lama, the Panchen Lama should be reported to Mongolian and Tibetan Affairs Commission, soul boys should be found, reported to and checked by Mongolian and Tibetan Affairs Commission, and a lot-drawing ceremony with the Golden Urn system should be held separately. Article 6 states that local governments should invite officials from the Central Government to take care of the sitting-in-the-bed ceremony. Article 7 states that soul boys should not be searched for from the current lama families.

The Method of Reincarnation of Lamas was abolished in 2004.

People's Republic of China 
In 2004, the Religious Affairs Regulations  was published by the Central Government. Article 36 states that the process of reincarnation system must follow religious rituals and history custom, and approved by government.

In 2007, the State Religious Affairs Bureau Order No. 5 was published by the Central Government. Article 7 states that no group or individual may carry out activities related to searching for and identifying the reincarnated soul boy of the Living Buddha without authorization. 

Article 8 states that a lot-drawing ceremony with the Golden Urn is applicable to those rinpoches, or lamas who were reincarnated previously in history. Requests for exemption are handled by State Administration for Religious Affairs, and for those with great impact, requests for exemption are handled by the State Council.

Usage

 Gedhun Choekyi Nyima was appointed by the 14th Dalai Lama as the 11th Panchen Lama on May 14, 1995; this appointment was disputed by the Chinese Communist central government, which removed Gedhun Choekyi Nyima as Panchen Lama and instead held a ceremony later that year in which Gyaincain Norbu was appointed the 11th Panchen Lama. The legitimacy of this appointment has been disputed by a number of sources.

See also
29-Article Ordinance for the More Effective Governing of Tibet
The Discourse of Lama
Sino-Nepalese War

Notes

References

Tibetan Buddhism and politics
Politics of Tibet
Qianlong Emperor